Cronbach can refer to:

 Abraham Cronbach (1882–1965), American Rabbi, teacher and known pacifist
 Lee Cronbach (1916–2001), American educational psychologist
 Cronbach's alpha, a coefficient of reliability developed by Lee Cronbach